Eternal Heart or Undying Pearl is a 1929 Japanese silent drama film directed by Hiroshi Shimizu. It is based on the novel of the same title by Kan Kikuchi and the earliest extant film by the director.

Plot
Typist Toshie is secretly in love with Narita, an employee working at the same company, but her reticent demeanour is no match against her younger, boisterous sister Reiko, who eventually becomes Narita's wife. Soon after their wedding, Narita, distraught over Reiko's lightweight manners and materialistic attitude, asks Toshie to exert her influence on her sister. When he asks Toshie if he underestimated her feelings for him in the past, she vehemently declines.

Katayama, Toshie's superior and a widower, proposes to her, but after meeting with his children and nieces, who mock her for being a simple typist, she leaves indignantly. Reiko, bored with her marriage life, meets with a former lover, which leads to a confrontation and crisis between the couple. Toshie tries to mediate, but Reiko declares that she will never change her ways. Narita goes abroad, remaining officially married, as a divorce would be socially unacceptable. Upon his departure, he expresses his hope that Toshie will become Katayama's wife, to which she replies, that she can't tell if this will happen.

Cast
 Emiko Yakumo as Toshie
 Michiko Oikawa as Reiko
 Minoru Takada as Shōzō Narita
 Jun Arai as Hirosuke Katayama

Legacy
Film historian Donald Richie compared the "modernist" appearance of Fue no shiratama with Marcel l'Herbier's L'Argent, and for Hiroshi Komatsu in The Oxford History of World Cinema, the film displayed "avant-garde techniques" and "dream-like settings".

Archive prints of Fue no shiratama have been screened at the University of California in 2005, at the Cinémathèque française in 2020 and 2021, and at the Museum of Modern Art in 2022.

References

External links
 

1929 films
Japanese silent films
Japanese drama films
Japanese black-and-white films
Films based on Japanese novels
Films directed by Hiroshi Shimizu
Silent drama films